Suzanne Flon (28 January 1918 – 15 June 2005) was a French stage, film, and television actress. She won the Volpi Cup for Best Actress for her performance in the 1961 film Thou Shalt Not Kill. Flon also received two César Awards and two Molière Awards in her career.

Early life
Her father was a railway worker and her mother crafted jewellery. Prior to becoming an actress, Flon worked as an English translator at the Paris department store Au Printemps and then as personal secretary to Édith Piaf. The great love of her life was the legendary film director John Huston. She never married.

Theatre roles
Flon's stage credits included plays by Jean Anouilh (L'Alouette, Antigone, Roméo et Jeannette), André Roussin (La Petite Hutte), and Loleh Bellon (La Chambre d'amis, Les Dames du jeudi, Changement à vue, and Une Absence).  Her English-language theatrical roles included Katherine (The Taming of the Shrew) and Rosalind (As You Like It).

Filmography

Awards and nominations

César Awards

Molière Awards

Venice Film Festival

Tributes
Director Danièle Thompson dedicated Avenue Montaigne to Flon, who had here her last film appearance. Writer-director John Huston described Flon as "the most extraordinary woman I have ever known."

References

External links

 
 
 
 "Obituary: Suzanne Flon (Article)" at The Independent on 3 September 2005

1918 births
2005 deaths
Best Supporting Actress César Award winners
French film actresses
French stage actresses
People from Val-de-Marne
Volpi Cup for Best Actress winners
20th-century French women